Ty Stiklorius (born Thaïs Stiklorius; February 25, 1975) is a music executive and film and television producer. Stiklorius is the founder and CEO of Friends At Work, a management company headquartered in Los Angeles.

Early life
Stiklorius was born in Philadelphia, Pennsylvania to Jon and Candace ( Pfeffer) Stiklorius. 

Stiklorius grew up in Philadelphia, Pennsylvania where she attended Friends' Central School, a Quaker friends school based in the Main Line. Stiklorius earned a bachelors degree from the University of Pennsylvania in 1997. She subsequently attended the Wharton School of Business where she earned a Masters of Business Administration in 2003.

Career
Prior to attending the Wharton School of Business, Stiklorius worked at a music tech company called G-Vox. She also worked at Monsoon Microstudios, a multi-media creative agency based in Philadelphia. 

After receiving an MBA, Stiklorius worked in Los Angeles under Kevin Mayer at the global strategy consulting firm, L.E.K. Consulting. After L.E.K., Stiklorius worked as the Director of Business Development under Sarah Harden and Tom Fuelling at Ascent Media.

In January 2009, Stiklorius became a partner at The Artists Organization (TAO), a talent management company with offices in New York, Santa Monica, and Nashville. She brought John Legend to TAO and managed his career while there.

In October 2012, Stiklorius became co-president with J. Irving at Troy Carter's Atom Factory, an entertainment and management company.

Friends At Work
Stiklorius founded a music management company, Friends At Work (FAW), in 2015 and remains its CEO.

JL Ventures and Get Lifted Film Co. 
In 2006, John Legend and Stiklorius founded JL Ventures. Shortly after the inception of JL Ventures, Stiklorius became Legend's full time manager.

In 2012, the Get Lifted Film Co. production company was founded. Ty is a principal alongside John Legend at the company.

Philanthropy 
In 2007, Stiklorius launched a non-profit called The Show Me Campaign with John Legend focused on education and criminal justice.

She also serves on various non-profit and private company boards, including Penn Law's Advisory Board for the Quattrone Center for the Fair Administration of Justice, LIFT-Los Angeles, and Americans for the Arts.

Credits

Filmography

References

External links
 
 Ty Stiklorius on Instagram
 Ty Stiklorius on Twitter
 Ty Stiklorius on LinkedIn
 

1975 births
21st-century American businesspeople
Living people
American chief executives
American music managers
American talent agents
Businesspeople from Philadelphia
University of Pennsylvania alumni
Wharton School of the University of Pennsylvania alumni
American people of Lithuanian descent
Primetime Emmy Award winners